Rock v. Arkansas, 483 U.S. 44 (1987), was a Supreme Court of the United States case in which the Court held that criminal defendants have a constitutional right to testify on their own behalf.

The right of a person to represent oneself in a court of law had been recognized for a very long time prior to this case. This right has been established by both legislative enactments and judicial rulings alike. An 1864 appropriations act allowed defendants to testify for themselves. The right of a criminal defendant to represent oneself had already been recognized by courts prior to this case. In Faretta v. California, the United States Supreme Court held that criminal defendants are constitutionally free to decline or reject professional lawyers as legal representation in state-level courts as well as to serve as their own legal counsels in such trials. In that case, the Court noted the lengthy history of the right by stating:
In the federal courts, the right of self-representation has been protected by statute since the beginnings of our Nation. Section 35 of the Judiciary Act of 1789, 1 Stat. 73, 92, enacted by the First Congress and signed by President Washington one day before the Sixth Amendment was proposed, provided that "in all the courts of the United States, the parties may plead and manage their own causes personally or by the assistance of counsel."

The movement in favor of allowing defendants to testify for themselves was popular, but its critics worried that it would destroy the presumption of innocence because of the perception that someone who is innocent of a crime would certainly speak to defend themselves and a person who is guilty of a crime would certainly not do so. This perception is inaccurate because a defendant's past becomes broadly admissible as evidence when they take the stand, so testifying may be against their interests. For example, when an individual with a criminal record testifies in their own trial, that past record can be presented to persuade the jury that they are the kind of person who would have done what they are accused of in the present. In a sense, the critics' worries have come to pass because relevant scholarship indicates that there is a measurable difference between the conviction rates of factually-innocent people whenever they do testify or they do not testify. Juries tend to convict criminal defendants who choose to testify for themselves at higher rates; likewise, juries tend to acquit criminal defendants who decline to testify for themselves.

See also
Johnson v. Zerbst (1938)
Betts v. Brady (1942)
Hoyt v. Florida (1961)
Gideon v. Wainwright (1963)
Sheppard v. Maxwell (1966)
Bruton v. United States (1968)
Apodaca v. Oregon (1972)
Johnson v. Louisiana (1972)
Argersinger v. Hamlin (1972)
Barker v. Wingo (1972)
Taylor v. Louisiana (1975)
Faretta v. California (1975)
Bounds v. Smith (1977)
Scott v. Illinois (1979)
Godinez v. Moran (1993)
Apprendi v. New Jersey (2000)
Martinez v. Court of Appeal of California, Fourth Appellate District (2000)
Alabama v. Shelton (2002)
Crawford v. Washington (2004)
Blakely v. Washington (2004)
Davis v. Washington (2006)
Indiana v. Edwards (2008)
Melendez-Diaz v. Massachusetts (2009)
Michigan v. Bryant (2011)
Bullcoming v. New Mexico (2011)
Alleyne v. United States (2013)
Peña-Rodriguez v. Colorado (2017)
Ramos v. Louisiana (2020)

References

External links
 

1987 in United States case law
United States Fourth Amendment case law
United States Fifth Amendment self-incrimination case law
United States Fourteenth Amendment case law
United States Supreme Court cases
United States Supreme Court cases of the Rehnquist Court